The Loughrea branch line was a railway line that opened in 1890 and closed in 1975. It was the last rural branch line to survive in Ireland.

Services

The branch had five round trip passenger services at its peak in 1895.  Many would be mixed passenger and freight.

Locomotives and Rolling Stock

Steam Era 

Pictures exist of 2-4-0 and 0-6-0 engines in use on the branch.

Dieselisation Era 

The branch was normally operated by a CIE 611 Class with a single passenger coach.  When that locomotive was unavailable for servicing or maintenance a CIE 201 Class Metropolitan-Vickers or a CIE 141 Class would normally substitute.  Exceptionally a CIE 001 Class could be used.

References

Further reading
 

Railway lines opened in 1890
Closed railways in Ireland
Transport in County Galway